Malcolm David "Mack" Hillis (July 23, 1901 – June 16, 1961) was a Major League Baseball second baseman. He had 9 career hits in 37 at bats in 12 games.

External links

1901 births
1961 deaths
Major League Baseball second basemen
Baseball players from Massachusetts
Pittsburgh Pirates players
New York Yankees players
Sportspeople from Cambridge, Massachusetts
Minor league baseball managers
Rochester Tribe players
Atlanta Crackers players
Toledo Mud Hens players
New Haven Profs players
Hollywood Stars players
Columbia Comers players
Portland Beavers players
Sacramento Senators players
Springfield Ponies players
Albany Senators players
Cambridge Cantabs players
Wayland Birds players